This is a list of journalism schools in North America.

Canada

Undergraduate programs
 Ryerson University, Toronto, Ontario
 Carleton University, Ottawa, Ontario
 Concordia University, Montreal, Quebec
 University of King’s College, Halifax, Nova Scotia
 University of Toronto Scarborough, Toronto, Ontario
University of Guelph-Humber Toronto, Ontario
 University of Ottawa, Ottawa, Ontario
Laurentian University, Sudbury, Ontario
 University of Prince Edward Island Charlottetown, Prince Edward Island
Trent University, Peterborough, Ontario
University of Regina, Regina, Saskatchewan
 University of Winnipeg, Winnipeg, Manitoba
 Kwantlen University College, Richmond, British Columbia
 MacEwan University, Edmonton, Alberta
 Mount Royal University, Calgary, Alberta
 St. Thomas University, Fredericton, New Brunswick
 Thompson Rivers University, Kamloops, British Columbia
 Université de Montréal, Montreal, Quebec
 Université du Québec à Montréal, Montreal, Quebec
 Vancouver Island University, Nanaimo, British Columbia
 Wilfrid Laurier University, Brantford, Ontario

Graduate programs
 Carleton University, Ottawa, Ontario
 Concordia University, Montreal, Quebec
 Ryerson University, Toronto, Ontario
 Université Laval, Laval, Quebec
 University of British Columbia, Vancouver, British Columbia
 University of King’s College, Halifax, Nova Scotia
 University of Western Ontario, London, Ontario

Diploma programs
Western Academy Broadcasting College, Saskatoon, Saskatchewan
 Algonquin College, Ottawa, Ontario
 British Columbia Institute of Technology, Burnaby, British Columbia
 Canadore College, North Bay, Ontario
 Centennial College, Toronto, Ontario
 College of the North Atlantic, Stephenville, Newfoundland and Labrador
 Conestoga College, Kitchener, Ontario
 Durham College, Oshawa, Ontario
 Fanshawe College, London, Ontario
 Holland College, Charlottetown, Prince Edward Island
 Humber College, Toronto, Ontario
 La Cité Collégiale, Ottawa, Ontario
 Langara College, Vancouver, British Columbia
 Lethbridge Community College, Lethbridge, Alberta
 Loyalist College, Belleville, Ontario
 Mohawk College, Hamilton, Ontario
 New Brunswick Community College, Woodstock, New Brunswick
 Niagara College, Welland, Ontario
 Northern Alberta Institute of Technology, Edmonton, Alberta
 Red River College, Winnipeg, Manitoba
 St. Clair College, Windsor, Ontario
 St. Lawrence College, Cornwall, Ontario
 Seneca College of Applied Arts and Technology, Toronto, Ontario
 Sheridan College, Brampton, Ontario
 Southern Alberta Institute of Technology, Calgary, Alberta

Mexico
 Escuela de Periodismo Carlos Septién García
 School of Journalism, Department of Communication and Journalism, Monterrey Institute of Technology and Higher Education, Monterrey

United States

Independent graduate programs 

Graduate Program in Journalism, Harvard Extension School, Faculty of Arts & Sciences, Harvard University, Massachusetts
 Graduate Program in Journalism, School of Humanities and Sciences, Stanford University, California

Professional schools (graduate-only) 

 Columbia University Graduate School of Journalism, at Columbia University
 Craig Newmark Graduate School of Journalism, at the City University of New York
 UC Berkeley Graduate School of Journalism, at the University of California, Berkeley

Professional schools (named) 

 A.Q. Miller School of Journalism and Mass Communications, at Kansas State University
 Annenberg School for Communication, at the University of Pennsylvania
 Annenberg School for Communication and Journalism, at the University of Southern California
 Arthur L. Carter Journalism Institute, at New York University
 Manship School of Mass Communication, at Louisiana State University
 E. W. Scripps School of Journalism, at Ohio University
 Edward R. Murrow College of Communication, at Washington State University
 Greenlee School of Journalism and Communication, College of Liberal Arts and Sciences, Iowa State University
Henry W. Grady College of Journalism and Mass Communication, at the University of Georgia
Hussman School of Journalism and Media, at the University of North Carolina at Chapel Hill
 Hank Greenspun School of Journalism and Media Studies, at the University of Nevada at Las Vegas
 Jack J. Valenti School of Communication, at the University of Houston
 Mayborn School of Journalism, at the University of North Texas
Medill School of Journalism, at Northwestern University
Perley Isaac Reed School of Journalism, at West Virginia University
Philip Merrill College of Journalism, at the University of Maryland
 Reynolds School of Journalism, at the University of Nevada, Reno
 Robertson School of Media and Culture, at Virginia Commonwealth University
 Russell J. Jandoli School of Journalism and Mass Communication, at St. Bonaventure University
S. I. Newhouse School of Public Communications, at Syracuse University
 Schieffer School of Journalism, College of Communication, at Texas Christian University
W. Page Pitt School of Journalism and Mass Communications, at Marshall University
Walter Cronkite School of Journalism and Mass Communication, at Arizona State University
 Washington Journalism Center in Washington, D.C.
 William Allen White School of Journalism, at the University of Kansas

Professional schools (unnamed) 

Missouri School of Journalism, at the University of Missouri
School of Communication, College of Arts and Sciences, at Ohio State University
 School of Communication, College of Social and Behavioral Sciences, at Northern Arizona University
 School of Communication, at Point Park University
 School of Communication, at the University of Miami
 School of Communication and Multimedia Studies, Dorothy F. Schmidt College of Arts and Letters, at Florida Atlantic University
 School of Communications, at Elon University
 School of Communications, College of Social Sciences, at the University of Hawaii at Manoa
 Northeastern University School of Journalism, at Northeastern University
 School of Journalism, College of Communication, at the University of Texas
 School of Journalism, College of Communication Arts and Sciences, at Michigan State University
 School of Journalism, College of Mass Communication and Media Arts, at Southern Illinois University Carbondale
 School of Journalism, College of Social and Behavioral Sciences, at the University of Arizona
 School of Journalism, at Indiana University
 School of Journalism, at State University of New York at Stony Brook
School of Journalism, at the University of Florida
 School of Journalism, at the University of Montana
 School of Journalism and Broadcasting, Potter College of Arts and Letters, at Western Kentucky University
 School of Journalism and Communication, at Southern Adventist University
 School of Journalism & Graphic Communication, at Florida A&M University
School of Journalism and Communication, at the University of Oregon
 School of Journalism and Mass Communication, College of Fine Arts and Communication, at Texas State University
 School of Journalism and Mass Communication, College of Liberal Arts, at the  University of Minnesota
 School of Journalism and Mass Communication, College of Liberal Arts & Sciences, at the University of Iowa
 School of Journalism and Mass Communication, at Drake University
 School of Journalism and Mass Communication, at Florida International University
 School of Journalism and Mass Communication, at Kent State University
 School of Journalism and Mass Communication, at Lenoir Rhyne University
 School of Journalism and Mass Communication, at the University of Colorado at Boulder
 School of Journalism and Mass Communication, at the University of Wisconsin–Madison
 School of Journalism and Mass Communications, College of Applied Arts and Sciences, at San Jose State University
 School of Journalism and Mass Communications, College of Mass Communications and Information Studies, at the University of South Carolina
 School of Journalism and New Media, at the University of Mississippi
 School of Journalism and Strategic Media, J. William Fulbright College of Arts and Sciences, at the University of Arkansas
 School of Mass Communication and Journalism, at the University of Southern Mississippi
 School of Mass Communication, College of Social Science & Communication, at the University of Arkansas at Little Rock
 School of Mass Communications, College of Arts and Sciences, at the University of South Florida
 School of Media and Public Affairs, at The George Washington University
 School of Media Arts and Design, at James Madison University

Departments 

 Department of Communication, College of Arts and Communication, University of Wisconsin Whitewater
 Department of Communication, College of Arts, Humanities, and Social Sciences, North Dakota State University
 Department of Communication, College of Fine, Performing, and Communication Arts, Wayne State University, Michigan
 Department of Communication, College of Letters and Science, University of Wisconsin-Oshkosh
 Departments of Communication and English, Wittenberg University, Ohio
 Department of Communication/Journalism, College of Arts & Sciences, Shippensburg University of Pennsylvania
 Department of Journalism, College of Communication, Boston University
 Department of Journalism, College of Communication and Education, California State University Chico
 Department of Journalism, College of Communications, The Pennsylvania State University
 Department of Journalism, College of Communication and Information Sciences, The University of Alabama
 Department of Journalism, College of Communication, Information, and Media, Ball State University, Indiana
 Department of Journalism, College of Humanities, San Francisco State University
 Department of Journalism, College of Journalism and Mass Communications, University of Nebraska
 Department of Journalism, College of Liberal Arts, California Polytechnic State University
 Department of Journalism, College of Media, University of Illinois Urbana-Champaign
 Department of Journalism, Eastern Illinois University
 Department of Journalism, Emerson College, Massachusetts
 Department of Journalism, Gaylord College of Journalism and Mass Communication, University of Oklahoma
 Department of Journalism, Harrington School of Communication and Media, University of Rhode Island
 Department of Journalism, Henry W. Grady College of Journalism and Mass Communication, University of Georgia
 Department of Journalism, Mike Curb College of Arts, Media and Communication, California State University, Northridge
 Department of Journalism, Roy H. Park School of Communications, Ithaca College, New York
 Department of Journalism, School of Communication, American University, Washington, D.C.
 Department of Journalism, Advertising, and Media Studies, College of Letters and Science, University of Wisconsin–Milwaukee
 Department of Journalism and Communications, College of Humanities and Social Sciences, Utah State University
 Department of Journalism and Mass Communication, College of Arts and Sciences, Abilene Christian University, Texas
 Department of Journalism and Mass Communications, College of Business, Murray State University, Kentucky
 Department of Journalism and Mass Communication, College of Liberal Arts, California State University Long Beach
 Department of Journalism and Media Studies, College of Arts and Sciences, University of South Florida St. Petersburg
 Department of Journalism and Public Relations, School of Media and Communication, Bowling Green State University, Ohio
 Department of Journalism and Strategic Media, College of Communication and Fine Arts University of Memphis, Tennessee
 Department of Journalism and Technical Communication, College of Liberal Arts, Colorado State University
 Department of Journalism, Media Studies, and Public Relations, School of Communication, Hofstra University, New York
 Department of Journalism, Public Relations and New Media, Baylor University, Texas
 Department of Journalism, School of Communications, Howard University, Washington, D.C.
 Department of Journalism, School of Communications and Theater, Temple University, Pennsylvania
 Department of Mass Communication and Journalism, College of Arts and Humanities, California State University Fresno
 Department of Television, Film, and Media Studies, College of Arts and Letters, California State University Los Angeles
 Departments of Journalism and Language & Communication, College of Arts, Letters, Graduate Studies, and Research, Northwestern State University, Louisiana
Tim Russert Department of Communication, College of Arts and Sciences, John Carroll University, Ohio

References

Journalism lists
Education in North America
Journalism schools